Bowismiln is a village in the Scottish Borders area of Scotland.

See also
List of places in the Scottish Borders
List of places in Scotland

External links

Villages in the Scottish Borders